Jealous One's Envy is the second studio album by American rapper Fat Joe, who had previously released his first album under the name Fat Joe da Gangsta. The album was released on October 24, 1995, by Relativity. The song "Watch Out" is known for having the first ever appearance of fellow New York rapper Big Pun.

Commercial performance
Jealous One's Envy debuted at number 71 on the US Billboard 200 chart on the week of November 11, 1995. The album also debuted at number seven on the US Top R&B/Hip-Hop Albums chart, becoming his first top-ten debut on the chart.

Track listing

Charts

References

Fat Joe albums
1995 albums
Albums produced by Diamond D
Albums produced by DJ Premier
Albums produced by L.E.S. (record producer)
Relativity Records albums
Albums produced by Domingo (producer)